Vitoria Airport  is an airport near Vitoria-Gasteiz, in the Basque Country of Spain. Located in the Foronda district, it is also called Foronda Airport. The airport has one terminal with 3 gates, 7 check-in counters and 16 stands for medium and light aircraft, and a 3,5 km long CAT II/III runway.

History
In 2005 Ryanair began daily flights from London Stansted Airport and in subsequent years flights from Dublin Airport. The airline left the airport in October 2007. Helitt Lineas Aereas also left the airport in January 2013. This led to a limitation of scheduled operations to the summer season. 

In summer 2015, a charter airline Air Nostrum offered flights to Palma de Mallorca, Mahón and Jerez.

However, in 2016, Ryanair announced its return to Vitoria with year-round services to Bergamo and Tenerife. In March 2017, Ryanair planned to connect Vitoria with Cologne Bonn, Milan Bergamo and Tenerife twice a week (2 flights a week to each) to serve 115,000 passengers per year. In April 2019, Ryanair announced their plans to expand the service by 40%, reaching 160,000 passengers. In October 2020, Ryanair decided to reinforce domestic routes by adding a connection to Alicante twice a week (December 2020 - end of February 2021).

Less travelled destinations include Ibiza, Madrid-Barajas and Barcelona-El Prat.

Airlines and destinations
The following airlines operate regular scheduled and charter flights at Vitoria Airport:

Statistics
In 2019, the airport served 174 thousand passengers (37% international, 63% domestic), operated 10,800 flights and processed 64,500 tonnes of cargo. In 2020, 45,359 passengers (73.9% less) used the airport but the number of flights (10,317) and cargo (64,334 tonnes) were similar.

References

External links

Official website

Airports in the Basque Country (autonomous community)
Airports established in 1935